Terence Stuart Eccles (born 2 March 1952, in Leeds) is an English former footballer who played 274 games and scored 77 goals in the Football League playing as a striker for Blackburn Rovers, Mansfield Town, Huddersfield Town and York City. He also had a short stint with the Greek club Ethnikos Piraeus and played in the Conference National for Scarborough.

References

1952 births
Living people
Footballers from Leeds
English footballers
Association football forwards
Blackburn Rovers F.C. players
Mansfield Town F.C. players
Huddersfield Town A.F.C. players
Ethnikos Piraeus F.C. players
York City F.C. players
Scarborough F.C. players
English Football League players
National League (English football) players
English expatriate sportspeople in Greece
English expatriate footballers
Super League Greece players